

Events

January events
 January 16 – The Galena and Chicago Union Railroad, the oldest portion of what is to become the Chicago and North Western Railway, is chartered.

February events
 February 5 – Henry R. Campbell of the Philadelphia, Germantown & Norristown Railroad patents the first 4-4-0, a steam locomotive type that will soon become the most common on all railroads of the United States.
 February 8 - London and Greenwich Railway opens its first section, the first railway in London, England.

March events
 March - The Syracuse and Utica Railroad, a predecessor of the New York Central Railroad, is chartered to build a railroad between its namesake cities in New York.

April events
 April – The first railroad car ferry in the U.S., the Susquehanna enters service on the Susquehanna River between Havre de Grace and Perryville, Maryland.

May events
 May 5 – The Albany and West Stockbridge Railroad is chartered as the successor to the Castleton and West Stockbridge Railroad in Massachusetts and eastern New York.
 May 19 – The Bristol and Exeter Railway receives parliamentary authorization.

July events
 July 13 – John Ruggles is awarded  for his improvements to railroad steam locomotive tires.
 July 21 – The Champlain and St. Lawrence Railroad opens between St. John and La Prairie, Quebec, the first steam-worked passenger railroad in British North America.

August events
 August 1 – The Utica and Schenectady Railroad, a predecessor of the New York Central Railroad in New York, opens.
 August 8 – Andover and Wilmington Railroad opens its line to Andover, Massachusetts.

September events
 September 5 – The Lake Wimico and St. Joseph Canal and Railroad, the first steam railroad in Florida, opens.

October events
 The Louisa Railroad of Louisa County, Virginia, an early predecessor of the Chesapeake and Ohio Railway, begins construction.
 October 25 – Construction begins on the Wilmington and Raleigh Railroad in North Carolina. Due to a lack of support in Raleigh, the route is revised to run from Wilmington to the Petersburg Railroad in Weldon.

December events
 December 14 – The London and Greenwich Railway opens throughout from London Bridge to Deptford.

Unknown date events
 The Bangor and Piscataquis Canal and Railroad Company operates the first steam railroad in Maine with two 2-2-0 locomotives manufactured in England.

Births

January births 
 January 2 - Fred T. Perris, Chief Engineer of the California Southern Railroad (d. 1916).

February births 
 February 9 – Franklin B. Gowen, president of the Philadelphia and Reading Railroad 1866–1883 (d. 1889).

March births 
 March 16 – Andrew Smith Hallidie, who developed the first practical cable car system for San Francisco, California (d. 1900).

May births 
 May 21 – Francis William Webb, Chief Mechanical Engineer of the London and North Western Railway (d. 1906).
 May 27 - Jay Gould, American financier who, with Jim Fisk, took control of the Erie Railroad (d. 1892).

September births 
 September 17 - William Jackson Palmer, builder of the Denver and Rio Grande Western Railroad (d. 1909).

Deaths

January deaths
 January 7 – John Molson, established the Champlain and Saint Lawrence Railroad, the first railway into Canada (b. 1763).

References
 Pennsylvania Railroad Historical and Technical Society (June 2004), PRR Chronology, 1836 (PDF). Retrieved March 5, 2005.
 White, John H, Jr. (Spring 1986), America's Most Noteworthy Railroaders, Railroad History, 154, p. 9–15.